Panagiotis Pipinelis (21 March 1899 – 19 July 1970) was a Greek politician and diplomat.

He was born on 21 March 1899 in the port city of Piraeus. He studied Law and Political science at the University of Zurich and, in 1920, at the Albert Ludwigs University of Freiburg in Germany.

He entered the Greek diplomatic corps in 1922 and served in several posts, rising to Permanent Vice Minister for Foreign Affairs in 1947–1948. In 1952 he was appointed permanent representative of Greece to NATO, and resigned from the diplomatic service the next year. He served as Minister for Trade in the 1961–1963 Konstantinos Karamanlis cabinet and, following Karamanlis' resignation and self-exile, Pipinelis served briefly as an interim Prime Minister of Greece from 17 June 1963 to 29 September 1963. On 20 November 1967 he was appointed as Minister of Foreign Affairs during the dictatorship. He held the post until his death of cancer on 19 July 1970 in Athens, aged 71.

References

1899 births
1970 deaths
20th-century prime ministers of Greece
Prime Ministers of Greece
Greek diplomats
Greek monarchists
Deaths from cancer in Greece
Foreign ministers of Greece
Permanent Representatives of Greece to NATO
1960s in Greek politics
Politicians from Piraeus
University of Zurich alumni
University of Freiburg alumni